Highway 932, the Cub Lake Trail, is a provincial highway in the north-east region of the Canadian province of Saskatchewan. It runs from Highway 106 to Highway 920. Highway 932 is about 20 km (12 mi) long.

See also 
Roads in Saskatchewan
Transportation in Saskatchewan

References 

932